Azhikode Lighthouse is situated about 8 km west of Kodungallur in Kerala. There was no lighthouse in the present location prior to this being inaugurated on 30 April 1982. The concrete tower of the lighthouse has a height of 30 meters.

Technical details 
There is a radio beacon installed at this lighthouse which came on air on 10 September 1981. The incandescent lamp was replaced by metal halide lamp on 30 September 1997. The direct drive system was also incorporated at the time.
This lighthouse was earlier known as Periyar River Lighthouse. A fixed light of 11 miles range was exhibited from a mast of 96 feet high by the State Port department in 1964 near the Port entrance and it worked till the commissioning of the new light in 1982. Azhikode Lighthouse was proposed as a guiding light for Cochin Port. The radio beacon was discontinued and a differential global positioning system was commissioned at Azhikod Lighthouse in 1994.

See also 

 List of lighthouses in India

References

External links 
 

Lighthouses in Kerala
Buildings and structures in Thrissur district
1982 establishments in Kerala
Transport in Thrissur district
Lighthouses completed in 1982